R.C. Kuhad was the former Vice Chancellor of Central University of Haryana. He has served Department of Microbiology, University of Delhi South Campus, India as a professor.

References

Living people
Academic staff of Delhi University
Place of birth missing (living people)
Year of birth missing (living people)
Academic staff of the Central University of Haryana